The Market: A Tale of Trade is a 2008 internationally co-produced drama film written and directed by Ben Hopkins and starring Tayanç Ayaydın as a small-time black market trader in a provincial town in eastern Turkey tasked with procuring some valuable medicine.

Production
The film was shot on location in Van Province, Turkey in April–June 2007.

Premise
From the film’s official website: "1994.  Mihram is a comic and inventive small-time blackmarket trader in a provincial town in Eastern Turkey. He has many ideas for good business deals, but never enough capital to realise them. One day the hospital supply truck is robbed, and the local GP hires Mihram to find some medicines on the black market. Finally, Mihram has the necessary capital to make a good deal, but he will have to gamble with the community’s money. If he loses, he will be an outcast.  If he wins, he will have a good start-up business. But he hasn’t reckoned with two things – the local mafia, and the inscrutable rules of the marketplace."

Release 
The film premiered at the Locarno International Film Festival in 2008. It has been released in cinemas in Germany, Belgium, Holland and Turkey.  The UK release was on 16 April 2010 and it has since been broadcast on the digital television channel BBC4.

Awards 
Locarno International Film Festival - Best Actor: Tayanç Ayaydın (won)
Ghent International Film Festival Best Film (won)
Antalya Golden Orange Film Festival
Best Film (won)
Best Actor: Tayanç Ayaydın (won)
Best Script (won)
Best Costume (won)

See also 
 2008 in film
 Turkish films of 2009

References

External links
  for the film
 
 

2008 drama films
2008 films
Films directed by Ben Hopkins
Films set in Turkey
Films shot in Turkey
German drama films
Golden Orange Award for Best Film winners
Kazakhstani drama films
Turkish drama films
British drama films
2000s Turkish-language films
2000s British films
2000s German films